Ascofare Oulematou Tambura is the sixth Vice-President of Mali's National Assembly, and a member of the Pan-African Parliament representing that country.

External links
Members of the Pan-African Parliament

Members of the Pan-African Parliament from Mali
Members of the National Assembly (Mali)
Living people
Year of birth missing (living people)
Place of birth missing (living people)
21st-century Malian people